The 2022 Midwest Athletic Conference football season was the season of college football played by the nine member schools of the Great Midwest Athletic Conference (GMAC) as part of the 2022 NCAA Division II football season.

Ashland compiled a 10–2 record, won the GMAC championship, and was ranked No. 12 in the final NCAA Division II poll. Ashland advanced to the Division II playoffs, losing to IUP in the second round.

Ashland linebacker Michael Ayers was selected as the GMAC Player of the Year. Lee Owens of Ashland was named Coach of the Year, and Hillsdale wide receiver Isaac TeSlaa was named Defensive Player of the Year.

Conference awards

Individual awards
 Player of the Year - Michael Ayers, linebacker, Ashland
 Offensive Player of the Year - Isaac TeSlaa, wide receiver, Hillsdale
 Defensive Player of the Year - Jaylin Garner, defensive line, Ohio Dominican
 Offensive Lineman of the Year - Ty Keirns, Ohio Dominican
 Defensive Lineman of the Year - Charlie Cleveland, Tiffin
 Freshman of the Year - Ethan Enders, offensive line, Ashland
 Special Teams Player of the Year - Anthony Lowe, return specialist, Tiffin
 Elite 26 Award - Jordan Speller, offensive line, Tiffin
 Coach of the Year - Lee Owens, Ashland

All-conference team
Offense first team
 Quarterback - Austin Brenner, Ashland
 Running backs - Michael Herzog, Hillsdale; Larry Martin, Ashland; Darius Pinnix, Tiffin
 Offensive line - Shane Bumgardner, Tiffin; Nehemiah Cannon, Ashland; Michael Jerrell, Findlay; Ty Keirns, Ohio Dominican; Gavin Posey, Ashland; Sam Puthoff, Ashland
 Wide receivers - Peyton Brown, Lake  Erie; Anthony Lowe, Tiffin; Isaac Teslaa, Hillsdale; Andrew Wolf, Ohio Dominican
 Tight end - Mike Rigerman, Findlay

Defense first team
 Defensive line - Jeffrey Barnett, Ashland; Grey Brancifort, Findlay; Jaylin Garner, Ohio Dominican; Charlie Cleveland, Tiffin; Eddie Miller-Garrett, Ohio Dominican
 Linebackers - Michael Ayers, Ashland; Stephen Baugh, Walsh; AJ Crider, Ohio Dominican; Jalen Humphrey, Kentucky Wesleyan; Kyle Kudla, Hillsdale
 Defensive backs - Kijana Caldwell, Findlay; Daishaun Hill, Ohio Dominican; Jayden Hill, Ohio Dominican; Devin Prude, Ashland; Jourdan Swett, Ashland

Special teams first team
 Punter - Luke Keller, Hillsdale
 Kicker - Austin Snyder, Findlay
 Return specialist - Anthony Lowe, Tiffin

Teams

Ashland

The 2022 Ashland Eagles football team represented the Ashland University as a member of the Great Midwest Athletic Conference (GMAC) during the 2022 NCAA Division II football season. In their 17th season under head coach Lee Owens, the Eagles compiled a 10–2 record (7–1 against conference opponents), won the GMAC championship, and were ranked No. 12 nationally at the end of the regular season.

Ohio Dominican

The 2022 Ohio Dominican Panthers football team represented the Ohio Dominican University as a member of the Great Midwest Athletic Conference (GMAC) during the 2022 NCAA Division II football season. In their sixth year under head coach Kelly Cummings, the Panthers compiled a 7–3 record (6–2 against conference opponents) and tied for second place in the GMAC.

Findlay

The 2022 Findlay Oilers football team represented the University of Findlay as a member of the Great Midwest Athletic Conference (GMAC) during the 2022 NCAA Division II football season. In their first season under head coach Kory Allen, the Oilers compiled a 7–4 record (6–2 against conference opponents) and tied for second place in the GMAC.

Tiffin

The 2022 Tiffin Dragons football team represented the Tiffin University as a member of the Great Midwest Athletic Conference (GMAC) during the 2022 NCAA Division II football season. In their fourth season under head coach Cris Reisert, the Dragons compiled a 6–5 record (6–2 against conference opponents) and tied for second place in the GMAC.

Hillsdale

The 2022 Hillsdale Chargers football team represented Hillsdale College as a member of the Great Midwest Athletic Conference (GMAC) during the 2022 NCAA Division II football season. In their 21st season under head coach Keith Otterbein, the Chargers compiled a 5–6 record (4–4 against conference opponents) and finished fifth in the GMAC.

Lake Erie

The 2022 Lake Erie Storm football team represented Lake Erie College as a member of the Great Midwest Athletic Conference (GMAC) during the 2022 NCAA Division II football season. In their second season under head coach D. J. Boldin, the Storm compiled a 3–8 record (3–5 against conference opponents) and finished sixth in the GMAC.

Northwood

The 2022 Northwood Timberwolves football team represented Northwood University as a member of the Great Midwest Athletic Conference (GMAC) during the 2022 NCAA Division II football season. In their seventh year under head coach Leonard Haynes, the Timberwolves compiled a 3–8 record (2–6 against conference opponents) and finished seventh in the GMAC.

Kentucky Wesleyan

The 2022 Kentucky Wesleyan Panthers football team represented Kentucky Wesleyan College as a member of the Great Midwest Athletic Conference (GMAC) during the 2022 NCAA Division II football season. In their first year under head coach Tyrone Young, the Panthers compiled a 2–9 record (1–8 against conference opponents) and tied for last place in the GMAC.

Walsh

The 2022 Walsh Cavaliers football team represented Walsh University as a member of the Great Midwest Athletic Conference (GMAC) during the 2022 NCAA Division II football season. In their second year under head coach John Frankhauser, the Cavaliers compiled a 1–9 record (1–7 against conference opponents) and tied for last place in the GMAC.

References

 
Great Midwest Athletic Conference football
Great Midwest Athletic Conference football